The 2002 Big 12 Conference women's soccer tournament was the postseason women's soccer tournament for the Big 12 Conference held from November 7 to 10, 2002. The 7-match tournament was held at the Blossom Athletic Center in San Antonio, TX with a combined attendance of 6,809. The 8-team single-elimination tournament consisted of three rounds based on seeding from regular season conference play. The Nebraska Cornhuskers defeated the Texas A&M Aggies in the championship match to win their 5th conference tournament.

Regular season standings
Source:

Bracket

Awards

Most valuable player
Source:
Offensive MVP – Christine Latham – Nebraska
Defensive MVP – Christy Harms – Nebraska

All-Tournament team

References 

 
Big 12 Conference Women's Soccer Tournament